Rick Gilstrap is a former American football player and coach. He served as the head football coach at Mars Hill University in Mars Hill, North Carolina from 1983 to 1984 and at Wofford College in Spartanburg, South Carolina from 1985 to 1987, compiling a career college football coaching record of 18–35-2. Gilstrap helped guide Wofford's transition from the National Association of Intercollegiate Athletics (NAIA) to the National Collegiate Athletic Association (NCAA). Gilstrap played college football at Clemson University between 1969 and 1971, starting 18 games at running back or quarterback. He has been married to Kiki Kirkland Gilstrap, Miss USA 1973 Miss Congeniality since 1977, and they are the parents of award-winning, professional soccer goalkeeper and coach, Hunter Gilstrap.

Head coaching record

References

Year of birth missing (living people)
Living people
American football quarterbacks
American football running backs
Clemson Tigers football players
Furman Paladins football coaches
Mars Hill Lions football coaches
The Citadel Bulldogs football coaches
Tulsa Golden Hurricane football coaches
Wofford Terriers football coaches
High school football coaches in South Carolina